François Jacques Clerc (born 18 April 1983) is a French former professional footballer who played as a right back.

Club career
Born in Bourg-en-Bresse, Clerc joined Olympique Lyonnais at the age of 14. After spending his first years as a senior with the reserves, he was loaned to Toulouse FC with which he first appeared in Ligue 1, making his debut in the competition on 14 August 2004 in a 4–1 away win against RC Strasbourg.

Returned to L'OL for the 2005–06 season, Clerc went on to become and important first-team member as the club won three national championships in a row, contributing with 62 league appearances combined in that timeframe. He battled with Anthony Réveillère for first-choice status during his tenure, appeared in 20 UEFA Champions League games but was also banned for four matches and fined €150,000 by the French Professional Football League, after he incurred in an illegal transfer agreement to Olympique de Marseille in 2006.

In the fall of 2010, free agent Clerc joined OGC Nice also in the top division after convincing manager Eric Roy his knee injury problems were a thing of the past. He scored a career-best four goals in his second year with the Côte d'Azur side, but they could only rank 13th.

On 9 July 2012, Clerc signed a three-year contract with AS Saint-Étienne. He scored his first and only goal of the campaign on 17 March 2013, helping the hosts come from behind for a 2–2 draw against Paris-Saint Germain FC.

After two seasons with Gazélec Ajaccio in Ligue 2, the 35-year-old Clerc announced his retirement.

International career
Clerc earned his first cap for France on 11 October 2006, in a 5–0 win over Faroe Islands for the UEFA Euro 2008 qualifiers. He was selected by coach Raymond Domenech for the finals in Austria and Switzerland, replacing longtime incumbent Willy Sagnol for the last and decisive group stage clash against Italy, which ended in a 2–0 loss and exit.

Honours
Lyon
Ligue 1: 2005–06, 2006–07, 2007–08
Coupe de France: 2007–08
Trophée des Champions: 2006, 2007
Coupe de la Ligue runner-up: 2006–07

Saint-Étienne
Coupe de la Ligue: 2012–13

References

External links

 
 
 
 
 
 

1983 births
Living people
Sportspeople from Bourg-en-Bresse
Footballers from Auvergne-Rhône-Alpes
French footballers
France under-21 international footballers
France international footballers
Association football defenders
Olympique Lyonnais players
Toulouse FC players
OGC Nice players
AS Saint-Étienne players
Gazélec Ajaccio players
Ligue 1 players
Ligue 2 players
UEFA Euro 2008 players